Glyphis is a genus in the family Carcharhinidae, commonly known as the river sharks. They live in rivers or coastal regions in and around south-east Asia and parts of Australia.

Taxonomy
This genus contains only three extant species. Further species could easily remain undiscovered, due to their secretive habits. This genus was thought to contain five different species, but recent studies on molecular data revealed that the species Glyphis gangeticus has an irregular distribution in the Indo-West Pacific region.

Species
The recognized species in this genus are:
 Glyphis gangeticus (J. P. Müller & Henle, 1839) (Ganges shark)
 Glyphis garricki L. J. V. Compagno, W. T. White & Last, 2008 (northern river shark)
 Glyphis glyphis (J. P. Müller & Henle, 1839) (speartooth shark)
 †Glyphis hastalis Agassiz, 1843
 †Glyphis pagoda (Noetling, 1901)

Distribution and habitat
Their precise geographic range is uncertain, but the known species are documented in parts of South Asia, Southeast Asia, New Guinea,  and Australia. Of the three currently described species, the Ganges shark is restricted to freshwater, while the northern river shark and the speartooth shark are found in coastal marine waters, as well. While the bull shark (Carcharhinus leucas) is sometimes called both the river shark and the Ganges shark, it should not be confused with the river sharks of the genus Glyphis. Bull sharks evolved to have their offspring in freshwater, therefore, making them safe to roam in the water while other sharks are able to survive in saltwater.

Conservation
River sharks remain very poorly known to science. They are facing a critically endangered status since they are so poorly studied, and people know very little about their population and life history. 
Glyphis gangeticus uses the Ganges River as nursery grounds and the birthplace of many Ganges shark offspring, however the population has been severely diminished owing to a long history of fishing and other pollution related issues in the Northern Arabian Sea. Additionally, India, where the Ganges river flows, is reported to be one of the top three greatest shark and ray capturers in the world, accounting for up to 9 percent of reported global landings (Jabado et al., 2018).  They have been found in nine different tidal areas, which consist of muddy waters with a low salinity. Their placement in connection to coastal marine waters indicates that they are usually born around October.

Images

References
Jabado, R. W., et al. “A Rare Contemporary Record of the Critically Endangered Ganges Shark
Glyphis Gangeticus.” Journal of Fish Biology, vol. 92, no. 5, Mar. 2018, pp. 1663–1669., doi:10.1111/jfb.13619.

White WT, Appleyard SA, Sabub B, Kyne PM, Harris M, Lis R, et al. (2015) Rediscovery of the Threatened River Sharks, Glyphis garricki and G. glyphis, in Papua New Guinea. PLoS ONE 10(10): e0140075. https://doi.org/10.1371/journal.pone.0140075
 
Taxa named by Louis Agassiz

Jabado, R. W., Kyne, P. M., Nazareth, E., & Sutaria, D. N. (2018). A rare contemporary record of the Critically Endangered Ganges shark Glyphis gangeticus. Journal of Fish Biology, 92(5), 1663–1669. https://doi.org/10.1111/jfb.13619